Alexandra Drewchin, known professionally as Eartheater, is an American multi-instrumentalist, producer, composer and vocalist. Born in northeastern Pennsylvania, she is currently based in Queens and has been performing since 2009. Her music has been released on independent labels Hausu Mountain and PAN.

Career
Eartheater has released four full-length solo albums and one mixtape. Metalepsis (March 2015) and RIP Chrysalis (November 2015) were released on the Chicago-based label Hausu Mountain. Reviewing her first album, Colin Joyce of Pitchfork noted that "Metalepsis is music that's built to overwhelm and envelop you, and maybe even, as Drewchin's moniker suggests, swallow worlds whole."

Irisiri (June 2018) was released on Berlin-based PAN. Andrew Ryce of Resident Advisor described the album as "baffling and inspired in equal measure", and Pitchfork named it one of "the best experimental albums of 2018."

After contributing a new one-off track to a Doom Trip compilation in April, Eartheater announced in August 2019 that she would release the mixtape Trinity in October 2019 via her own imprint, Chemical X. In December of the same year, she released a collaborative EP with LEYA titled Angel Lust for PAN.

In May 2020, Eartheater shared the single "Below the Clavicle", which was later included on her fourth album, Phoenix: Flames Are Dew Upon My Skin, released through PAN on October 2, 2020. The album was mostly created over a ten-week artist residency in Zaragoza, Spain, drawing inspiration from the Earth's geology.

In addition to her solo work, Eartheater has collaborated with artists like Show Me the Body and Moor Mother. She also contributed guitar on the 2019 Caroline Polachek single "Ocean of Tears" and has covered Mazzy Star's "Fade into You" with Sega Bodega on Reestablishing Connection, a cover project benefiting the AIM COVID-19 Crisis Fund. In November 2022, Madonna's daughter Lourdes Leon released her debut EP Go, executively produced by Eartheater, under the moniker Lolahol via Chemical X.

Discography

Studio albums
Metalepsis (Hausu Mountain, 2015)
RIP Chrysalis (Hausu Mountain, 2015)
Irisiri (PAN, 2018)
Phoenix: Flames Are Dew Upon My Skin (PAN, 2020)

Mixtapes
Trinity (Chemical X, 2019)

Remix albums
Phoenix: La Petite Mort Édition (PAN, 2021)

Collaborations
Angel Lust (PAN, 2019) (with LEYA)

References

1989 births
Living people
American people of British descent
American people of Russian descent
American performance artists
21st-century American women musicians
American experimental musicians
American women singer-songwriters
American women in electronic music
Record producers from Pennsylvania
People from North East, Pennsylvania
Singer-songwriters from Pennsylvania